is a former Japanese football player.

Playing career
Kohara was born in Tondabayashi on July 22, 1983. He joined J1 League club Kyoto Purple Sanga (later Kyoto Sanga FC) from youth team in 2002. On October 12, he debuted as substitute forward against Urawa Reds. However he could only play this match until 2003. Sanga was also relegated to J2 League end of 2003 season and repeated promotion to J1 and relegation to J2 after that. Although he played several matches every season from 2004, he could not play many matches. In July 2007, he moved to Japan Football League club Tochigi SC and played many matches. He retired end of 2007 season.

Club statistics

References

External links

1983 births
Living people
Association football people from Osaka Prefecture
People from Tondabayashi, Osaka
Japanese footballers
J1 League players
J2 League players
Japan Football League players
Kyoto Sanga FC players
Tochigi SC players
Association football forwards